The Roman Catholic Archdiocese of Acapulco is a Latin rite Metropolitan Archdiocese in Mexico's southwestern Guerrero state.

Its cathedral archiepiscopal see is Catedral Nuestra Señora de la Soledad, dedicated to Our Lady of Solitude, in the touristic port city of Acapulco. It is currently led by Archbishop Leopoldo González González.

History 
 The Diocese of Acapulco / Acapulcan(us) (Latin) was erected on 18 March 1958, on territory split off from the then Diocese of Chilapa (now its suffragan as Diocese of Chilpancingo–Chilapa)
 On 1964.10.27 it lost territory to establish Diocese of Ciudad Altamirano, now its suffragan.
 It was elevated on 10 February 1983 to Metropolitan Archdiocese of Acapulco.

Statistics 
As of 2014, the archdiocese pastorally served 2,039,000 Catholics (76.9% of 2,650,000 total) on 18,000 km² in 78 parishes and 4 missions with 132 priests (107 diocesan, 25 religious), 19 deacons, 152 lay religious (30 brothers, 122 sisters) and 33 seminarians.

Bishops
(all Roman Rite native Mexicans)

Episcopal Ordinaries 
Suffragan Bishops of Acapulco
 José del Pilar Quezada Valdez (1958.12.18 – retired 1976.06.01), died 1985
 Rafael Bello Ruiz (1976.06.01 – 1983.02.10 see below), succeeding as previous Titular Bishop of Segia (1974.02.12 – 1976.06.01) and Auxiliary Bishop of Acapulco (1974.02.12 – 1976.06.01)

Metropolitan Archbishops of Acapulco
 Rafael Bello Ruiz (see above 1983.02.10 – retired 2001.05.08), died 2008
 Felipe Aguirre Franco (2001.05.08 – retired 2010.06.07), previously Titular Bishop of Otricoli (1974.03.12 – 1988.04.28) as Auxiliary Bishop of Tuxtla Gutiérrez (Mexico) (1974.03.12 – 1988.04.28), succeeding as Bishop of Tuxtla Gutiérrez (1988.04.28 – 2000.06.30), Coadjutor Archbishop of Acapulco (2000.06.30 – succession 2001.05.08)
 Auxiliary Bishop : Juan Navarro Castellanos (2004.01.31 – 2009.02.12), Titular Bishop of Caput Cilla (2004.01.31 – 2009.02.12); next Bishop of Tuxpan (Mexico) (2009.02.12 – ...)
 Carlos Garfias Merlos (2010.06.07 – retired 2016.11.05), previously Bishop of Ciudad Altamirano (Mexico) (1996.06.24 – 2003.07.08), Bishop of Nezahualcóyotl (Mexico) (2003.07.08 – 2010.06.07); next Metropolitan Archbishop of Morelia (Mexico) (2016.11.05 – ...)
 Leopoldo González González (2017.06.30 – ...), previously Titular Bishop of Voncaria (1999.03.18 – 2005.06.09) as Auxiliary Bishop of Archdiocese of Morelia (Mexico) (1999.03.18 – 2005.06.09), Bishop of Tapachula (Mexico) (2005.06.09 – 2017.06.30).

Coadjutor bishop
 Felipe Aguirre Franco (2000–2001)

Auxiliary bishops
 Rafael Bello Ruiz (1974–1976), appointed Bishop here
 Juan Navarro Castellanos (2004–2009), appointed Bishop of Tuxpan, Veracruz

Ecclesiastical province 
The Metropolitan's suffragan sees are :
 Roman Catholic Diocese of Chilpancingo-Chilapa, its mother (then as Diocese of Chilapa)
 Diocese of Ciudad Altamirano, its daughter
 Roman Catholic Diocese of Tlapa.

See also
 List of Catholic dioceses in México

Sources and external links 
 GCatholic - data for all sections
 Archdiocese of Acapulco page at catholichierarchy.org retrieved July 14, 2006

Roman Catholic dioceses in Mexico

Roman Catholic dioceses and prelatures established in the 20th century
Roman Catholic ecclesiastical provinces in Mexico
Acapulco
Religious organizations established in 1958
1958 establishments in Mexico